State Trunk Highway  (often called Highway 194, STH-194 or WIS 194) was an  state highway Rusk and Taylor counties in the US state of Wisconsin. The road was turned over to county control in 2005, and is now County Trunk Highway D (CTH-D).

History
WIS 194 was initially formed in 1949 as a temporary route along an incomplete bypass of Janesville. The route ran from US 14 (now CTH-E) to US 51. Once the bypass was finished, US 14 moved north onto the bypass; this effectively removed WIS 194 and established City US 14 along the old US 14 alignment.

WIS 194 was formed when CTH-D in Rusk and Taylor counties between WIS 27 and WIS 73 was transferred to state control. By 1992, the state transferred the eastern  segment from the Town of McKinley east to WIS 73. One  segment was given to the county and became CTH-H while the rest became local roads. The remainder of the highway was transferred to the two counties on October 3, 2005.

Major intersections

See also

References

External links

194
Transportation in Rusk County, Wisconsin
Transportation in Taylor County, Wisconsin